#Yaaram is a 2019 Indian romantic comedy film directed by Ovais Khan and produced by Vijay Mulchandani, Deepak Mulchandani and Karan Mulchandani. The film, features Prateik Babbar, Siddhanth Kapoor and Ishita Raj Sharma. The story of the film follows inter-religious relationships. Principal photography commenced in July 2018 in Mauritius. It was released on 18 October 2019.

Cast
 Prateik Babbar as Rohit Bajaj
 Siddhanth Kapoor as Sahil Qureshi
 Ishita Raj Sharma as Zoya Qureshi
 Dalip Tahil as Sangarsh Bajaj
 Anita Raj as Vijeyta Bajaj
 Adnan Azim as Mohit
 Subha Rajput as Mira
 Nataša Stanković (Special appearance in song "Baby Mera")

Soundtrack

This soundtrack of the film is composed by Jeet Gannguli, Rochak Kohli, Sohail Sen and Nayeem-Shabir with lyrics written by Kumaar and Dheeraj Kumar.

Critical reception

References

External links

 
 

2010s Hindi-language films
2019 films
Films shot in London
Indian romantic comedy films
Films scored by Jeet Ganguly
Films scored by Rochak Kohli
Films scored by Sohail Sen
2019 romantic comedy films